The Astin Mansion is a historic house located at 506 W. 26th Street, Bryan, Texas, USA. It was built in 1920 and designed in the English Georgian Revival style. It has been listed on the National Register of Historic Places since September 25, 1987.

The Astin Mansion was built by Roger Q. Astin for his wife Nina (née Heard).  Roger Astin was the youngest son of James Hugh Astin, a wealthy landowner and owner of the Rivermist cotton plantation.  The Astin family significantly shaped the growth of Bryan, Texas and the Brazos Valley.  There are several charitable organizations in the area that bear the Astin name as a result of the philanthropy of Nina Astin.

The Astin Mansion was designed by architect Hal B. Thompson.  Mr. Thompson also designed Highland Park in Dallas.  The main house has 96 windows and 16 sets of French doors.  The original slate roof has been maintained.  Many of the interior fixtures, chandeliers and mirrors are original to the house.  The overmantle was carved by Peter Mansbendel in the style of the famous English carver Grinling Gibbons.  Mr. Mansbendel also carved several of the limestone and cast stone mantles.  The ironwork is thought to be from Henry Potter Ironworks of Dallas.  The Astin Mansion complex also includes a carriage house that has been converted into a lounge.  Above it is an apartment.  Additionally, behind the main house, there is a children's playhouse built by Nina Astin for her children that is a miniature of the mansion.

The Astin Mansion has been used as a Special Events Venue for upscale events since 2004.

See also

National Register of Historic Places listings in Brazos County, Texas

References

External links

Houses on the National Register of Historic Places in Texas
National Register of Historic Places in Brazos County, Texas
Bryan, Texas
Georgian Revival architecture in Texas
Houses completed in 1924